Several vessels of the Royal Navy have been named HMS Nonsuch, presumably named after Nonsuch Palace:

 , a 38-gun great ship, rebuilt from a previous ship and sold c. 1645
 , a 34-gun ship launched in 1646 and wrecked 1664
 , an 8-gun ketch launched in 1650 that the Royal Navy purchased in 1654 and sold in 1667; later as the merchant vessel Nonsuch she made the trading voyage establishing the Hudson's Bay Company
 , a 36-gun fifth rate launched in 1668. Upgraded to a 42-gun fourth rate in 1669, but reverted to 36-gun fifth rate in 1691. She was captured in 1695 by the French privateer 
 , a 5-gun hoy launched in 1686 and sold 1714
 , a 48-gun fourth-rate ship of the line, launched in 1696, rebuilt 1717, and broken up in 1745
 , a 50-gun fourth-rate ship of the line in service from 1741 to 1766
 , a 64-gun third-rate ship of the line launched in 1774, used as a floating battery from 1794, and broken up in 1802
 , an  launched in 1915 and sold in 1921
 , a  sloop laid down in February 1945 and canceled in October of that year
 , the former German Type 1936A ('Narvik') destroyer  taken after the end of World War II, and scrapped in 1949

Battle honours
 Kentish Knock 1652
 Portland 1653
 Gabbard 1653
 Texel 1673
  St. Lucia 1778
 The Saints 1782
 Jutland 1916

See also
 , a Canadian Forces Naval Reserve division in Edmonton, Alberta
 HMS Nonsuch is used as a sample ship name by the Royal Navy, signifying a hypothetical vessel, or a "ghost consort"
 A fictional HMS Nonsuch (a 74-gun ship of the line) appears in the tales of Horatio Hornblower

References

Royal Navy ship names